Andre Alexander Ramsey (born July 24, 1987) is an American football offensive tackle who is currently a free agent. He was signed by the Seattle Seahawks as a 7th round draft pick in 2009. He played college football at Ball State.

Ramsey has also been a member of the Buffalo Bills, New York Jets, Baltimore Ravens, Miami Dolphins, Kansas City Command and the Carolina Panthers.

Professional career

Seattle Seahawks
After going in the 7th round of the NFL draft Ramsey went on to play in 6 games that 2009 season recording 5 starts

Buffalo Bills
Ramsey was signed to the practice squad of the Buffalo Bills . He remained there until being promoted to the active roster on December 11 after offensive tackle Demetress Bell was placed on injured reserve. Andre started 32 games for the bills during his career .

New York Jets
The New York Jets signed Ramsey October 25, 2010. Ramsey went on to start 8 games that season at right and left tackle.

Baltimore Ravens
After trying out for the Ravens Andre went on to play in 12 games the next season with both starts at guard and tackle help his team to the AFC championship game

Miami Dolphins
The team signed Ramsey to their practice squad on November 30, 2011. He was on the practice roster for one game before being released.

Kansas City Command
Following his release from the Dolphins Ramsey signed with the Kansas City Command of the Arena Football League . The 2012 Arena Football League season spanned from March 9, 2012 – July 22, 2012.

Carolina Panthers
Signed as a free-agent by the Panthers on August 10, 2012. Where played in 14 games at left guard having his most productive season to date until being place on season ending IR week 14 of the season

BC Lions
On March 26, 2013, Andre Ramsey signed with the BC Lions of the Canadian Football League. Starting all 18 games at left tackle

Calgary Stampeders
In June 2015, Ramsey signed with the Calgary Stampeders where he started 12 games at left tackle

Orlando Predators
On December 7, 2015, Ramsey was assigned to the Orlando Predators. On May 25, 2016, Ramsey was placed on recallable reassignment.

References

External links
Buffalo Bills bio
Seattle Seahawks bio
Ball State Cardinals bio
BC Lions bio

1987 births
Living people
People from Portsmouth, New Hampshire
Sportspeople from Rockingham County, New Hampshire
Players of American football from New Hampshire
People from Crisp County, Georgia
Players of American football from Georgia (U.S. state)
American football offensive tackles
Ball State Cardinals football players
Seattle Seahawks players
Buffalo Bills players
New York Jets players
Baltimore Ravens players
Kansas City Command players
BC Lions players
Calgary Stampeders players
American players of Canadian football
Canadian football offensive linemen
Orlando Predators players